Mounia Bourguigue (born January 21, 1975) is a taekwondo practitioner from Morocco. She competed at the 2000 Summer Olympics in Sydney, where she placed 5th, and at the 2004 Summer Olympics in Athens, where she placed 11th. She won medals at the World Championships in 1997 and in 2003.

References

External links
 

1975 births
Living people
Moroccan female taekwondo practitioners
Olympic taekwondo practitioners of Morocco
Taekwondo practitioners at the 2000 Summer Olympics
Taekwondo practitioners at the 2004 Summer Olympics
World Taekwondo Championships medalists
20th-century Moroccan women
21st-century Moroccan women